Cara Black and Rennae Stubbs were the defending champions, but lost in the semifinals to Daniela Hantuchová and Ai Sugiyama.

Conchita Martínez and Virginia Ruano Pascual won in the final, defeating Daniela Hantuchová and Ai Sugiyama 6–7(7–9), 6–1, 7–5.

Seeds
The top four seeds received a bye into the second round.

Draw

Finals

Top half

Bottom half

External links
Main and qualifying draws

Southern California Open
Acura Classic - Doubles